Brigadier Syed Mujtaba Tirmizi, SI(M) (Urdu: سيد مجتبى ترمزى‎) is a retired Brigadier of the Pakistan Army and a member of the Central Board of Film Censors and currently working as the CEO of Al-Tirmiz Films and Director H-Cube BMG Pvt. Ltd. He is also a Director of RUH Forum and AMBLEM System. He is a former Director of ISPR Inter-Services Public Relations, where he directed, produced and facilitated state of the art productions like Faseel-e-Jaan Se Aagay, The Glorious Resolve, Waar, Khuda Kay Liye, Life of A Siachen Soldier and more (see more in filmography paragraph).

Early life and education 
Mujtaba hails from the notable Hindko-speaking family of Sayyids from Abbottabad. From Muhammad's lineage through Fatima and Ali Al-Murtaza, Mujtaba's family can be traced from the tenth Imam of Ahl al-Bayt, Imam Ali Al-Hadi Al Naqi which makes him a Naqvi Sayyid. After Imam Naqi he descends from Pir Baba which makes him a Tirmizi Sayyid.

After his matriculation, he was selected at the Pakistan Military Academy in 1982, and passed out from the academy in 74th PMA Long Course in October 1986. He gained commission in the army as 2nd-Lt in the Azad Kahmir Regiment.

He is a graduate of the School of Infantry and Tactics in Quetta, the National University of Modern Languages in Islamabad, the Riphah International University in Islamabad and the University of Insubria in Italy.

Positions held 
In 1992, Capt Mujtaba served as the Armed Forces Public Relations Officer for the United Nations mission in Cambodia.

In 1997, Maj Mujtaba served as the Academy Adjutant Pakistan Military Academy,

In 2004, Lt.Col Mujtaba served as the director or media relations of XI (9th) IX South Asian Federation Games.

In 2004, Lt.Col Mujtaba started to serve ISPR Inter-Services Public Relations as the assistant director.

In 2006, Col Mujtaba was appointed as the deputy director ISPR Inter-Services Public Relations.

In 2011, Brig Mujtaba was appointed as the director ISPR Inter-Services Public Relations.

In 2016, Brig Mujtaba was appointed as the director of HRD Directorate in GHQ Rawalpindi.

In 2016, He has held portfolios of head of FFBL Institute of Executive Leadership and Development, HOD Corporate Communications Department, HOD Corporate Development Division.
In 2017, He has been company secretary and general manager for coordination of FFBL.

In 2020, He was appointed as the chief operating officer of Fauji Meat Limited.
Currently, he is the chief executive officer (CEO) of Al-Tirmiz Films and H-Cube BMG Pvt. Ltd. Director of RUH Forum and AMBLEM System. Besides this, he is on visiting faculty of local and foreign universities and is striving for the excellence of Pakistan by doing local & charitable works and producing and directing harmony delivering films.

Military ranks

Filmography

Directed documentaries 
 Hum Siphahi Hain TeleFilm
 2 Sipahi
 50 Years Of Peace Keeping
 60 Years Of Pakistan Army
 Drill Sergeant Major
 Life of a Siachen Soldier
 President Body Guards
 Wahga
 Parade Charger
 The Glorious Resolve
 Role of Pakistan Army in Social Uplift of the Country
 Pak's War on Terror
 Peace Keeping Vol I & II
 Op Aqua (Rehab of Sakhar Barrage)
 Wana Olives (War on terror)
 In the Wake of Earthquake
 Wild Rose
 Winds of Change (Dev in FATA)
 Op Life Line
 Taraqi ka Safar (Dev in FATA)
 Roshan Subh (Dev in FATA)

Directed / Facillitated Films 
 Waar
 Khuda Kay Liye
 Chambeli
 Sayaa e Khuda e Zuljalal

Directed drama serials 
 Wilco
 Khuda Zameen Sey Gaya Nahi Hai
 Faseel e Jaan Sey Aagay
Sipahi Maqbool Hussain

Directed songs 
 Assalam Assalam
 Chand Roshan
 Apni Jaan Nazar Kru
 Jazba e Dil 
 Zameen Jaagti Hai
 Alam Uthao Saathiyo
 Khuda Zameen Sey Gaya Nahi Hai
 Hamat Walay Dharti Kay Rakhwalay
 Maine Janma Hai Tujhko
 Khuda Karay Meri Arz e Pak pe utray 
 Wattan ki Matti
 Yaaro Mera Yaar Na Raha
 Chaadar Hai Maa Ki
 Hum Koi Shahadat Bhoole Nahi
 Saatheio Mujahido
 Mei Bhi tou Pukara Jao Ga
 Ye Ghazi Ye Teray Purisrar Banday
 Bara Dushman Bana Phirta Hai
 Imtehan Hai Imtehan

Honors and awards 
 Sitara-i-Imtiaz (Military) 2016
 First prize Rome Film Festival 2003-2012
 CJCSC Commendation Card 2008
 COAS Commendation Card 2008
 KARA Film Festival 2008
 COAS Commendation Card 1993
 UN Force Commanders Commendation Card for displaying of Bravery & Sacrifice 1992
 Boys Scouts Gold Medal 1981

Publications 

 Pictorial - Peacekeepers in Cambodia
 News Paper - The Pak Post Cambodia
 Peace Keeping Manual Volume - I & II
 Pakistani Media – A Catalyst for Peace or An Apple of Discord

References 

People from Abbottabad
Pakistani military officer
Pakistani film directors
Pakistani film producers
Pakistan Military Academy alumni
Living people
1966 births